Mah Neshan (also Romanized as Māh Neshān and Māhneshān) is a city in the Central District of Mahneshan County, Zanjan province, Iran, and serves as capital of the county. At the 2006 census, its population was 4,495 in 1,119 households. The following census in 2011 counted 5,439 people in 1,422 households. The latest census in 2016 showed a population of 5,487 people in 1,626 households.

References 

Mahneshan County

Cities in Zanjan Province

Populated places in Zanjan Province

Populated places in Mahneshan County